is a 2008 Japanese drama film that is based on a true event that took place in an elementary school in Osaka Prefecture. The film is directed by Tetsu Maeda, and its story is based on a novel about the event by Yasushi Kuroda. Actor Satoshi Tsumabuki plays the lead role of the class teacher in this film. Additionally, this film stars 28 school children chosen by audition.

School Days with a Pig was first screened at the 21st Tokyo International Film Festival, and it was subsequently released in Japanese cinemas on 1 November 2008.

Plot
The film revolves around the story of an elementary school teacher who proposes that his class raise a piglet at school with the aim of eating it once it has grown up.

Cast
 Satoshi Tsumabuki as Mr. Hoshi, the class homeroom teacher
 Ren Ohsugi as Mr. Nishina (school Vice Principal)
 Tomoko Tabata as Ms. Ikezawa
 Seiji Ikeda as Mr. Kowasi
 Mieko Harada as School Principal Mrs. Takahara
 Ryohei Kondo
 Runa Natsui		
 Itsumi Osawa		
 Yumi Shimizu as the music teacher
 Pierre Taki	
 Naho Toda

Students

Year 6 Class 2 Students 

  as 
  as  
  as 
  as 
  as 
  as 
  as 
  as 
  as 
  as 
  as 
  as 
  as 

  as 
  as 
  as 
  as 
  as 
  as 
  as 
  as 
  as 
  as 
  as 
  as 
  as

Production

Development
School Days with a Pig was first announced on 25 August 2008.

Music
The theme song for the film School Days with a Pig is the song  that is sung by singer Tortoise Matsumoto. This was announced together with the announcement of this film on 25 August 2008.
 「Prayer」 Lyrics By：　Lyrics (English) by ：Lynne Hobdny　Songwriter： 吉岡聖治　歌：清水ゆみ

Release
This film was first released at the 21st Tokyo International Film Festival, where it was one of the films participating in the competition.  It was then released in Japan cinemas on 1 November 2008.

Later, this film was released in Singapore on 8 April 2009.

Home Video
The home video was released in DVD (Region 2) format on Amazon Japan on 4 October 2009. A special limited 2-disc edition was also released on the same day.

Reception

Critical response
Rotten Tomatoes reported that 78% of users liked this movie, based on 104 user ratings. The DVD version of this movie was ranked #30,660 on the Amazon Bestsellers Rank (in DVD) The special version was ranked #39,011 on the same list.

According to this movie's Taiwanese release official site, more audiences did not want to eat the pig as compared to those who voted to eat the pig.

Accolades

References

External links
 Yahoo channel 
 
 
 allcinema 
 Official website (Taiwan) 
 Kinejun Cinema 

2008 films
Films about pigs
2000s Japanese-language films
Nikkatsu films